Cheng Feng (born 21 April 1990) is a Chinese basketball player for Liaoning Hengye and the Chinese national team, where she participated at the 2014 FIBA World Championship.

References

1990 births
Living people
Chinese women's basketball players
Power forwards (basketball)
Small forwards
Liaoning Flying Eagles players
Manchu sportspeople